Peter Wilson (1952 – 1 August 1973) was a man from Northern Ireland who was abducted and killed by the Provisional Irish Republican Army. The IRA never gave any explanation for his abduction and murder. His body was not found for 37 years, and he was listed as one of the Disappeared by the Independent Commission for the Location of Victims' Remains.

Disappearance
Wilson, a native of West Belfast, with five siblings, was described as "a vulnerable man with learning difficulties". He was abducted by the IRA in the summer of 1973, somewhere in the St. James area of Belfast, and killed. Only in 2009 was he added to the list of Northern Ireland's 'Disappeared'. His body was located at the beach in Waterfoot, County Antrim on 2 November 2010, the day after excavations began following the receipt of "reliable and high quality" information. His family had often walked on the beach, unaware that he was buried there. Wilson was the ninth of the known "Disappeared" to be located since 1999.

See also
Charles Armstrong
Independent Commission for the Location of Victims' Remains
List of solved missing person cases
Murder of Jean McConville
Murder of Paul Quinn
Murder of Thomas Oliver
Disappeared (Northern Ireland)
Thomas Murphy (Irish republican)
Gerard Evans
Columba McVeigh
Robert Nairac
Murder of Gareth O'Connor
Internal Security Unit

References

External links
 Thedisappearedni.co.uk 
 Malachiodoherty.com

1970s missing person cases
1973 murders in the United Kingdom
1973 in Northern Ireland
August 1973 events in the United Kingdom
Deaths by firearm in Northern Ireland
Enforced disappearances in Northern Ireland
Formerly missing people
Missing person cases in Ireland
Terrorism deaths in Northern Ireland